Pan Mei-chen (born 30 June 1969) is a Taiwanese singer-songwriter.

Music career
Born on 30 June 1969 in Taiwan. Her recording career started in 1987, and she has produced many albums over the years. Her talents range from songwriting to playing various instruments to performing. She has also appeared in many music videos. She is popular not only in her native country but in mainland China, Hong Kong, and Chinese communities in Singapore, Malaysia, and other parts of Southeast Asia.

Other activities
After the 921 earthquake in Taiwan in 1999, Pan recorded the hit song "I Want a Home" (我想有個家) to raise awareness for victims of the disaster.

In 2002, Pan opened a musical academy in Taichung. The academy teaches music not only as an art but as a platform for a career in entertainment.

Though her career has waned since the late 1990s, she released albums in 2003 and 2006.

Personal life
Her favorite band is Guns N' Roses. Growing up, she had a reputation as a tomboy. Throughout her life, she has enjoyed sports such as swimming, bowling, and rifle shooting.

Awards
1987: her debut creative song "悔" (Regrets) won the 1st Taiwan Youth Creative Folk Contest
1988: Best New Singer Award of the Year of Taiwan from the China Times Evening News
1989: voted the Most Popular Female Singer by local magazines in Singapore and Malaysia
1990: "I Want a Home" won the Best Song Award of the Year of the 1st Golden Melody Awards
1991: Best Singer Award by CCTV Energetic 28 (活力28), making her the first Taiwan singer to win the award
1994: Top Ten Idol Award of the Year, ranked 5th; the only female singer in the list
1994: nominated as Most Popular Female Singer in the 2nd 933 Golden Melody Awards in Singapore
1996: her album The True Pan Mei Chen was nominated as Best Album of the Year in the Golden Melody Awards

1969 births
Living people
Taiwanese Mandopop singer-songwriters
Musicians from New Taipei
20th-century Taiwanese women singers
21st-century Taiwanese women singers